Jean Baptiste Lefebvre de Villebrune (Senlis, Oise, 1732 – Angoulême, 7 October 1809) was a French philologist, physician and translator.

Selected works
 Dictionnaire des particules angloises, précédé d'une grammaire raisonnée, ouvrage dans lequel toutes difficultés de langage sont aplanies, et où on trouvera tous les moyens de l'entendre et de l'écrire en peu de temps, le tout rapporté à l'usage (1774)
 Le Bouquet royal, impromptu en prose et en vaudevilles, arrangé de manière à pouvoir être joué à chaque fête royale, à l'aide des variantes, représenté pour la première fois sur les théâtres d'Orléans, Moulins et autres villes, les 1er. janvier 1815 et jours suivants (1815)
 Translation from English into French of William Hamilton's work Détails historiques des tremblemens de terre arrivés en Italie, depuis le 5 février jusqu'en mai 1783, par M. le chevalier Hamilton (1783)
 Translation from English into French of Michael Underwood's work Traité sur les ulcères des jambes, précédé de remarques en forme d'introduction sur le procédé de l'ulcération et l'origine du pus louable ; suivi d'une méthode heureuse de traiter certaines tumeurs scrophuleuses, les ulcères des mamelons, les crevasses du sein et les abcès laiteux, par M. Michel Underwood. On y a joint la méthode de feu M. Else, de traiter les ulcères des jambes (1785)
 Translation from English into French of William Grant's's work Recherches sur les fièvres selon qu'elles dépendant des variations des saisons et telles qu'on les a observées à Londres ces vingt dernières années-ci (3 volumes, 1783–85)
 Translation from Italian into French of Riguccio Galluzzi's work Histoire du grand duché de Toscane sous le gouvernement des Médicis (9 volumes, 1782–84)

External links
 

1732 births
1809 deaths
18th-century French writers
18th-century French male writers
Academic staff of the Collège de France
English–French translators
French philologists
18th-century French physicians
French translators
German–French translators
Italian–French translators
French medical writers
Spanish–French translators
Translators from Swedish
Translators to French
French male non-fiction writers
18th-century French translators